Deposit is a village in Broome and Delaware counties in the U.S. state of New York. The population was 1,663 at the 2010 census.

The village, on the county line, is half within the town of Sanford (Broome County) and half within the town of Deposit (Delaware County). The Broome County portion of Deposit is part of the Binghamton Metropolitan Statistical Area.

History 

The position of the village is at the boundary of White and Indian territory, as imposed by the 1763 Fort Stanwix Treaty. The village was incorporated in 1811 in Delaware County. Deposit is one of only twelve villages in New York still incorporated under a charter, the other villages having incorporated or re-incorporated under the provisions of Village Law.

While the dairy industry is now important, the name of the town is said to derive from its status as a lumber center, when it was the place at which logs were "deposited" into the river for transport south by raft.

Geography
The village is located by the West Branch of the Delaware River and the Southern Tier Expressway (New York Route 17).

Deposit is located at  (42.061856, -75.423358).

Demographics

As of the census of 2000, there were 1,699 people, 716 households, and 436 families residing in the village. The population density was 1,350.9 people per square mile (520.6/km2). There were 823 housing units at an average density of 654.4 per square mile (252.2/km2). The racial makeup of the village was 96.53% White, 0.94% African American, 0.06% Native American, 0.82% Asian, 0.06% Pacific Islander, 0.94% from other races, and 0.65% from two or more races. Hispanic or Latino of any race were 2.71% of the population.

There were 716 households, out of which 31.1% had children under the age of 18 living with them, 43.7% were married couples living together, 12.4% had a female householder with no husband present, and 39.0% were non-families. 34.1% of all households were made up of individuals, and 19.1% had someone living alone who was 65 years of age or older. The average household size was 2.37 and the average family size was 3.03.

In the village, the population was spread out, with 27.1% under the age of 18, 8.8% from 18 to 24, 24.8% from 25 to 44, 22.1% from 45 to 64, and 17.2% who were 65 years of age or older. The median age was 37 years. For every 100 females, there were 87.5 males. For every 100 females age 18 and over, there were 84.9 males.

The median income for a household in the village was $24,702, and the median income for a family was $32,016. Males had a median income of $27,202 versus $19,333 for females. The per capita income for the village was $14,390. About 15.0% of families and 17.6% of the population were below the poverty line, including 25.8% of those under age 18 and 12.8% of those age 65 or over.

References

External links
 Official village website
 Deposit Chamber of Commerce
 Early history of Deposit and surrounding area

 

Villages in Broome County, New York
Villages in Delaware County, New York
Binghamton metropolitan area
Populated places established in 1811
1811 establishments in New York (state)
Villages in New York (state)